Ross Point School was a historic rural, African-American school building located near Laurel, Sussex County, Delaware. Funding for the building was provided by Pierre S. du Pont. It was built in 1922, and was a rectangular, one-story wood-frame building in the Colonial Revival style.  It had a hipped roof and cedar shingle siding.  It had an entrance portico with a triangular pediment. It remained in use as school until September 24, 1964, when it was officially consolidated into the Laurel Special School District.

It was added to the National Register of Historic Places in 2001. It is listed on the Delaware Cultural and Historic Resources GIS system as destroyed or demolished.

References

School buildings on the National Register of Historic Places in Delaware
Colonial Revival architecture in Delaware
School buildings completed in 1922
Schools in Sussex County, Delaware
Laurel, Delaware
National Register of Historic Places in Sussex County, Delaware
1922 establishments in Delaware